Kierra Valencia "Kiki"  Sheard-Kelly (born June 20, 1987) is an American gospel singer. She is the daughter of gospel singer Karen Clark-Sheard (member of gospel singing group the Clark Sisters) and granddaughter of gospel choral director Mattie Moss Clark. Sheard portrayed her mother in the hit Lifetime movie, The Clark Sisters: First Ladies of Gospel. After appearing on her mother's (most notably, the seminal Finally Karen) and aunt's albums, Sheard broke to the music scene with the release of her debut album I Owe You in 2004. Her hit single "You Don't Know" was inspired by her mother almost losing her life to a fatal blood clot.

Early life
Born in Detroit, Michigan, and raised in the suburb of West Bloomfield, Sheard spent her formative years surrounded by the influences of her family, their faith, and their music. At age 5, she began singing in the choir at Greater Emmanuel Institutional Church of God in Christ, pastored by her father, Bishop J. Drew Sheard.

Music career

1997–2003: Early career 
Sheard made her professional recording debut at the age of 9, on her mother's debut solo album Finally Karen (1997). The song "The Will Of God" won a Stellar Award for Best Children's Performance. In the following years, Sheard performed as background vocalist for her mother, aunt Dorinda Clark-Cole and the Clark Sisters. In 2002, Sheard was featured on Clark-Cole's self-titled debut album. In 2003, she featured on her mother's third album, The Heavens Are Telling, on "You Loved Me" (a gospel cover of Jill Scott's "He Loves Me (Lyzel In E Flat)") and alongside J Moss  on "Don't Change".  That same year, EMI Gospel won a bidding war among several record companies to sign Sheard.

2004–2005: I Owe You 
Her debut album I Owe You was released on September 7, 2004. The 11-track set included production and songwriting from Rodney Jerkins, Warryn Campbell, Erica and Tina Campbell of Mary Mary, Sheard's cousin J Moss, and Tonéx. The album also functioned as the production debut for her brother J Drew. With the release of I Owe You, Sheard became the first new artist in Billboard history to debut at number one on the Top Gospel Albums chart.

EMI commissioned a collection of remixes entitled Just Until... on August 2, 2005. The title of the stopgap release was abbreviated from its working title, "Just Until The Next Record". The album had a surprise international hit in the Godson Concept remix of "Let Go". The upbeat gospel single, released only in Japan, raced to the top of the mainstream R&B charts and remained there for several weeks.

2006–2007: This is Me 
Shortly after graduating high school, Sheard readied her second album, This Is Me. It debuted at No. 1 on Billboards Top Gospel Albums chart when it was released on June 27, 2006. A midtempo fan favorite, the Fred Jerkins III-produced "Why Me?" was chosen as the lead single for the album. Sheard shot her first music videos for two subsequent singles from the album, "Yes" and "This Is Me". The album was Grammy Award-nominated for Best Contemporary R&B Gospel Album in December 2006.

In addition to performing at the 2007 Stellar Awards ("Why Me?"), Sheard appeared on BET's Celebration of Gospel, standing in for pregnant Faith Evans in "Endow Me" (as popularized by Sheard's mother and aunts) along with Coko, Lil' Mo, and Fantasia. Sheard also sang with her mother for A Tribute to Aretha Franklin.

2008–2009: Bold Right Life 
In 2008, Sheard featured on Mary Mary's crossover hit, "God in Me", from The Sound album. "God in Me" became Sheard's first appearance on the US Hot 100, where it peaked at number 68. Furthermore, the single broke the Billboard record for the longest chart-run by a group and longest chart-run by a gospel song on the Hot R&B/Hip-Hop Songs chart, where it spent a total of 74 weeks and peaked at number 5. "God in Me" was also a major hit on Billboard'''s Dance Club and Hot Gospel Songs charts, peaking at number one on both and spending 7 consecutive weeks atop the latter. Further to this, "God in Me" was awarded for "Outstanding Song" at the 41st NAACP Image Awards.

In October 2008, Sheard released her third album, Bold Right Life. Named after Sheard's youth organization in Detroit, the album was described by Billboard as a 'powerful mix of R&B/hip-hop, pop, rock and traditional gospel' which 'shifts from a hot uptempo beat (opener “Won’t Hold Back”) to pop (“My Boyfriend”) then to rock (“Invisible”) and traditional (“Praise Him Now”)'. The album's two lead singles were "Praise Him Now" and "Won't Hold Back". "Praise Him Now" peaked at number 7 on the US Hot Gospel Songs chart, whilst "Love Like Crazy" became Sheard's second Japanese hit, peaking at number 7 on the Japan Hot 100.

In January 2009, Sheard performed the Clark Sisters' "Jesus Is a Love Song" at the BMI Trailblazers Luncheon in honor of her aunt Elbernita "Twinkie" Clark.

The same year, Sheard released a compilation, KiKi's Mixtape, on September 22, 2009. KiKi's Mixtape included two new songs - “Sing to the Lord”, co-written by Kierra and described as 'a high-octane amalgam of rock, CCR and power pop' and a 'bold and bracing' cover of Donny Hathaway's "This Christmas" with Marcus Cole.

 2010–2013: Free and The Sheards 

Sheard had a role in the film Preacher's Kid (starring platinum-selling R&B artist LeToya Luckett, Durrell Babbs, Clifton Powell, Gregory Alan Williams, and Sharif Atkins), which was released in theaters across the U.S. on January 29, 2010 and was released on DVD and Blu-ray disc on May 4, 2010.

Sheard's fourth album, Free, was released on October 18, 2011. This was her first album on her family's gospel label, Karew Records (pronounced Kuh-Rue). Originally scheduled for a July 12, 2011 release, the album was leaked and subsequently pushed back and reformatted with a different track listing. The album features Sheard's BRL (Bold Right Life) Choir.

On April 7, 2013, Sheard and her family debuted in a new BET reality series, The Sheards. The show is based on the lives of Sheard, her brother and producer J. Drew, and her parents, Grammy Award-winning Karen Clark Sheard and Pastor J. Drew Sheard Sr. Season 1 had a run of eight episodes, and it was announced on the BET Twitter account that Season 2 would debut in the fall of 2014.

 2013–present: Graceland, Clark Sisters biopic and Kierra 
Sheard released the single "Trumpets Blow" in 2013, which was followed by "2nd Win" in 2014, which peaked within the top 20 of Billboard's Top Gospel Songs chart. Shortly after in 2014, her fifth album Graceland, was released on June 22, 2014. Graceland became her second top 40 appearance on the Billboard 200 and fourth number one on the Top Gospel Albums chart. Graceland also earned Sheard a nomination for Contemporary Female Vocalist of the Year at the 30th Annual Stellar Awards.

In 2020, a Lifetime biographical film, The Clark Sisters: First Ladies of Gospel was released, starring Kierra Sheard as her mother Karen Clark-Sheard, which became the highest rated original movie release by Lifetime in four years. The film's soundtrack, also starring Sheard, debuted at number 8 on the Billboard Top Gospel Albums chart, where it remained in its second week.

Following this, Sheard released her sixth album Kierra. Debuting at number one on the Billboard Top Gospel Albums chart with 6,000 equivalent album units, it became her fifth chart-topping album, replacing Kanye West's Jesus is King which had held the number one spot for 6 months since November 9, 2019. Sheard co-wrote the entire album, which includes a mix of studio and live tracks recorded in her hometown, Detroit. The album spawned 3 top 20 singles on the Hot Gospel Songs chart; "Don't Judge Me", "It Keeps Happening" and "Something Has To Break" (featuring Tasha Cobbs Leonard), the latter peaking at number 5.

In April 2021, Sheard was featured on actor and rapper, Nick Cannon's rendition of Fred Hammond's gospel classic, No Weapon''. In October 2021, Kierra's "Something Has to Break," featuring her mother, Karen Clark-Sheard, peaked at number one on the Hot Gospel Airplay chart, making it her fourth song to top the chart. Billboard explained, 'Kierra ties for the third-most Gospel Airplay No. 1s among women, dating to the chart's 2005 inception, matching Tasha Cobbs Leonard. Tamela Mann leads and shares the overall mark with Kirk Franklin (eight No. 1s), while Jekalyn Carr has notched five.'

Personal life 
Sheard is a graduate of Wayne State University (her father's alma mater) in Detroit, Michigan, where she received her bachelor's degree in English with a minor in psychology.  Though her touring schedule has been curbed to accommodate her academic goals, Sheard did embark on a Japanese tour with her mother Karen Clark-Sheard in August 2006. In 2013, Sheard began preaching at her father's church and others. In 2017, she was officially licensed in the COGIC as an evangelist.

In June 2015, Sheard released the Fall/Winter collection of Eleven60, which honors her inspiration, her mother, Karen Clark Sheard.  Eleven60 is named for the month and year that Clark Sheard was born. Sheard has personally designed classic and refreshing looks for the professional curvy woman that is chic, sexy, bold and eclectic. She has crisscrossed the globe and absorbed the fashion trends of New York City, London, Paris, Tokyo and Seoul.

In 2020 after releasing 3 singles “Don’t Judge Me (ft. Missy Elliot)”, “It Keeps Happening”, and “Something has to Break (Ft. Tasha Cobbs Leonard)” she released her live self titled “KIERRA” produced by her brother and producer J. Drew Sheard.

On June 20, 2020, her 33rd birthday, Sheard became engaged to her fiancé Jordan Kelly and on December 12, 2020, the two married.

On December 12, 2020, Sheard announced that she and Kelly had married in a private ceremony surrounded by close family and friends. 

In April 2021 Sheards first Book titled "Big, Bold and Beautiful: Owning the Woman God Made You to Be" is set to be released 
(A book for young teens and young adults)

Discography

Albums

Remix albums

Compilation albums

Soundtrack albums

Extended plays

Singles

as lead artist

as a featured artist

Other charted songs

Album appearances

Soundtrack appearances

Awards

Dove Awards

The Dove Awards are awarded annually by the Gospel Music Association. Kierra Sheard has won 3 awards from 10 nominations.

Grammy Awards

The Grammy Awards are awarded annually by the National Academy of Recording Arts and Sciences. Kierra Sheard has received 3 nominations.

NAACP Image Awards 
The NAACP Image Awards are presented by the NAACP. Kierra Sheard has received two nomination.

Stellar Awards
The Stellar Awards are awarded annually by SAGMA. Kierra Sheard has received 6 awards from 16 nominations.

Notes

References

External links 
 
 

1987 births
American child singers
American gospel singers
Performers of Christian contemporary R&B music
Singers from Detroit
21st-century African-American women singers
Living people
American Pentecostals
Members of the Church of God in Christ
African-American Christians